Pinnacle Valley is the northwesternmost neighborhood of the city of Little Rock, Arkansas. The area is to the south of Pinnacle Mountain, one of the highest elevations in Pulaski County.  Like Chenal Valley which borders the area on its south side, Pinnacle Valley is a fast-developing portion of Little Rock as the city continues to expand westward.

The neighborhood is anchored by Arkansas Highway 10 (which is officially signed as Cantrell Road on the portions that are inside Little Rock corporate limits), although most in the area refer to the path  located west of an intersection with Interstate 430  simply as Highway 10.  Minor developed areas including Pleasant Ridge and Walton Heights buffer Pinnacle Valley from the interstate on its eastern side.  To the west and other directions lie unincorporated areas of Pulaski County.

Development of Pinnacle Valley's commercial corridor along Highway 10 has increased specifically since 2000, with new office complexes and retail centers still under construction by the spring of 2006.  Juxtaposed with the new construction is a small number of existing homes from years prior to the area's annexation into Little Rock's city limits, including the formerly unincorporated community of Pankey.

The area, which includes the Little Maumelle River, was subject to a major flood when the Arkansas River crested at 29.71 feet (nearly seven feet above flood stage) on the early morning of June 5, 2019.  This is the fourth highest recorded level. <US Army Corps of Engineers>

The Ranch, a western portion of the neighborhood that adjoins the highway to the north, is the site of small family home development and major employers including a customer service call center for AT&T Mobility (the wireless operations of AT&T Inc. formerly named Cingular Wireless) and headquarters for the craft-instruction guide publisher Leisure Arts, which has many products affiliated with the Time, Inc. subsidiary of Time Warner.

Neighborhoods in Little Rock, Arkansas